Oldfields School is a college preparatory school for girls in grades 8 through 12 in Sparks Glencoe, Maryland. , Oldfield's School had approximately 180 boarding and day students in grades 8 through 12, coming from 28 states and 15 countries. Among the school's notable graduates was Wallis Warfield Simpson, who became the Duchess of Windsor.

Athletics
In 2014 and 2015, the Oldfields School Cross-Country team won the Interscholastic Athletic Association of Maryland Conference C Championships. In 2015, the Oldfields School Badminton shared top honors in the IAAM Conference B Championship with Institute of Notre Dame.

Notable alumnae
Niki de Saint Phalle, sculptor
Wallis, Duchess of Windsor
Alice du Pont Mills, Du Pont heiress
Abir Muhaisen, princess of Jordan
Helen Pitts-Blasi, American trainer of thoroughbred race horses
Lana du Pont, Olympic equestrian

References

External links
 Oldfields School
 The Association of Boarding Schools profile

Private high schools in Maryland
Private schools in Baltimore County, Maryland
Educational institutions established in 1867
Girls' schools in Maryland
Private middle schools in Maryland
Preparatory schools in Maryland
1867 establishments in Maryland